The Rosua is a right tributary of the river Șieu in Romania. It discharges into the Șieu in Șintereag. Its tributaries are Valea Aurului, Valea Lungă and Valea Blăjenilor, all from the left.

References

Rivers of Romania
Rivers of Bistrița-Năsăud County